Pat Flannery (born September 23, 1957) is an American former college basketball coach.  He served as the head men's basketball at Lebanon Valley College from 1989 to 1994 and Bucknell University from 1994 to 2008. Flannery was born in Pottsville, Pennsylvania, and attended Pottsville Area High School, graduating in 1976. He played college basketball at Bucknell as a point guard, leading the Bison to several league championships before graduating in 1980.  Flannery led his team, a 14-seed, to a first-round victory in the 2005 NCAA Division I tournament over Kansas. Bucknell's victory was the first NCAA Tournament win ever for any Patriot League team.  In the 2006 regular season the Bison went undefeated in Patriot League play.  In the 2006 NCAA tournament, the Bison beat Arkansas in the first round for their second consecutive first-round victory. Following the 2007–08 basketball season, Flannery retired after 14 seasons as Bucknell's head coach. He resides in Lewisburg, Pennsylvania, and now works in a fundraising capacity for Bucknell.

Head coaching record

References

1957 births
Living people
American men's basketball coaches
American men's basketball players
Basketball coaches from Pennsylvania
Basketball players from Pennsylvania
Bucknell Bison men's basketball coaches
Bucknell Bison men's basketball players
Drexel Dragons men's basketball coaches
Lebanon Valley Flying Dutchmen men's basketball coaches
Point guards
Sportspeople from Pottsville, Pennsylvania
William & Mary Tribe men's basketball coaches